Ryan Patrick Murphy (born November 9, 1965) is an American television writer, director, and producer. He has created and produced a number of television series including  Nip/Tuck (2003–2010), Glee (2009–2015), American Horror Story (2011–present), American Crime Story (2016–present), Pose (2018–2021), 9-1-1 (2018–present), 9-1-1: Lone Star (2020–present), Ratched (2020–present), American Horror Stories (2021–present), and Dahmer – Monster: The Jeffrey Dahmer Story (2022).
Murphy also directed the 2006 film adaptation of Augusten Burroughs' memoir Running with Scissors, the 2010 film adaptation of Elizabeth Gilbert's memoir Eat, Pray, Love, the 2014 film adaptation of Larry Kramer's play The Normal Heart, and the 2020 film adaptation of the musical The Prom.

Murphy has received six Primetime Emmy Awards from 36 nominations, a Tony Award from two nominations, and two Grammy Award nominations. He has often been described as "the most powerful man" in modern television, and signed the largest development deal in television history with Netflix. Murphy is noted for having created a shift in inclusive storytelling that "brought marginalised characters to the masses".

Early life
Murphy was born on November 9, 1965, in Indianapolis, Indiana, where he was raised in a Catholic family. His ancestry includes Irish and Danish. He attended Catholic school from first through eighth grade, and graduated from Warren Central High School in Indianapolis. He has described his mother J. Andy Murphy as a "beauty queen who left it all to stay at home and take care of her two sons". She wrote five books and worked in communications for over 20 years before retiring. His father worked in the newspaper industry as a circulation director before he retired after 30 years.

After coming out as gay aged 15, Murphy saw his first therapist, who found nothing wrong with him other than being "too precocious for his own good". During a 2012 interview on Inside the Actors Studio, Murphy claimed that he secretly dated "a lot of football players" in high school. He performed with a choir as a child, which would later inform his work on Glee.

Murphy attended Indiana University Bloomington, where he majored in journalism and was a member of the Singing Hoosiers vocal ensemble. He interned at The Washington Post in 1986 alongside reporter Kara Swisher. He was placed in the style section.

Career

1990–2008: Popular and Nip/Tuck
Murphy started as a journalist working for The Miami Herald, Los Angeles Times, New York Daily News, Knoxville News Sentinel and Entertainment Weekly. He began scriptwriting in the late 1990s, when Steven Spielberg purchased his script Why Can't I Be Audrey Hepburn?.

Murphy started his career in television with the teen comedy series Popular, which he co-created with Gina Matthews. The series premiered on The WB on September 29, 1999 and ran for two seasons, ending in 2001. During the time, his production company Ryan Murphy Productions signed a deal with the Warners. He then created the FX drama series Nip/Tuck, which premiered on July 18, 2003. In 2004, Murphy earned his first Primetime Emmy Award nomination for Outstanding Directing for a Drama Series. Murphy took the show's signature line, "Tell me what you don't like about yourself," from a plastic surgeon he met when he was a journalist researching an undercover story on plastic surgery in Beverly Hills. The series ended after six seasons in 2010.

In 2006, Murphy wrote the screenplay for and directed the feature film Running with Scissors. Based on the memoir by Augusten Burroughs, the movie version starred Annette Bening, Alec Baldwin and Brian Cox and, as the young Burroughs, Joseph Cross.

2009–2017: Glee and American Horror Story
On May 19, 2009, Murphy's musical comedy-drama series, Glee, premiered on Fox. He co-created the series with Brad Falchuk and Ian Brennan. In its early seasons, the show was critically lauded. Murphy won his first Primetime Emmy Award for directing the pilot episode. The series concluded in 2015 following its sixth season. Murphy was one of four executive producers on the reality television series The Glee Project, which premiered on Oxygen on June 12, 2011. The show featured a group of contestants vying for the prize of a seven-episode arc on Glee, with someone being eliminated each week, until the winner is chosen in the final episode. The show was renewed for a second season, which ended up being its last. Murphy was openly critical of several prominent bands for not releasing music for use in Glee, for which he subsequently apologised.

In 2010, Murphy directed Julia Roberts in an adaptation of Elizabeth Gilbert's memoir Eat, Pray, Love. The film was a box office success but a critical failure, receiving harsh reviews criticizing its pacing and lack of credibility. To date, the film has grossed $204,482,125 worldwide.

Murphy and Falchuk created the anthology series American Horror Story, which premiered on FX on October 5, 2011. Most of the same cast have played different characters in different settings each subsequent season.

Murphy and Glee co-executive producer Ali Adler created the half-hour comedy The New Normal, which premiered on NBC on September 10, 2012. The series was based on Murphy's own experiences of having a child via surrogate, with the main characters, Bryan and David, named for Ryan and his husband. The series was ultimately cancelled after one season.

Murphy next directed the 2014 television film adaptation of  Larry Kramer's Broadway play The Normal Heart, starring Mark Ruffalo, Roberts, Baldwin, Jonathan Groff, Matt Bomer and Jim Parsons. Murphy then collaborated with The Normal Heart executive producer Jason Blum to produce a metasequel to the cult-classic horror film The Town That Dreaded Sundown. The film was the directorial debut of Alfonso Gomez-Rejon and was also released in 2014. In October 2014, FX greenlit a companion anthology series, American Crime Story, which Murphy and Falchuk executive produce. The series premiered on February 2, 2016.

Murphy, Falchuk and Brennan next co-created the comedy-horror series Scream Queens, which premiered on Fox on September 22, 2015. The series was cancelled after two seasons.

Murphy's next project, the drama anthology series Feud, premiered on FX in 2017. The first season focused on the rivalry between Bette Davis and Joan Crawford on the set of their 1962 film What Ever Happened to Baby Jane?.

2018–present: 9-1-1, Pose and Netflix productions
In 2018, Murphy co-created the police procedural drama  9-1-1 and also served as its director, writer and executive producer.

With newcomer Steven Canals, a research assistant for Dustin Lance Black before his Master of Fine Arts at UCLA, Murphy and Falchuk launched a new series, Pose, set in the Ball community in mid-1980s New York City. Murphy had wanted to adapt Paris Is Burning as a series and Canals had been writing a script while at graduate school centered on a young African American teen made homeless for being gay, who moved to New York with dreams of going to dance school and who became adopted by a House mother. Joining Canals, Murphy and Falchuk in the writing room were Our Lady J and Janet Mock, who Murphy also encouraged to direct an episode, making her the first trans woman of colour to do so, as well as the first trans woman of colour in a TV series writing room.

The series premiered on FX on June 3, 2018, attracting critical acclaim. The first season boasted the largest cast of transgender actors ever for a scripted network series with over 50 transgender characters, all played by trans actors. On July 12, 2018, it was announced that the series had been renewed for a second season, which premiered in 2019.

In May 2018, ahead of the premiere, Murphy announced that he would donate all of his profits from Pose to charitable organizations working with LGBTQ+ people, tweeting a different non-profit including Sylvia Rivera Law Project, Transgender Legal Defense & Education Fund, and Callen-Lorde Community Health Center telling Variety that: "The thing that struck me in talking to so many of them, was how much they've struggled, how under attack they feel, how many of them find it difficult getting healthcare, and finding jobs. I just decided I need to do more than just making a show for this community. I want to reach out and help this community."

In 2018, Netflix signed Murphy for a development deal with a compensation of $300 million over a period of five years.

In September 2019, The Politician was released on Netflix to generally positive reviews. The series was nominated for two Golden Globe Awards and renewed for a second season due to be released in late 2020. Murphy then co-created the 9-1-1 spin-off series 9-1-1: Lone Star, which premiered on Fox in January 2020.

In May 2020, the period miniseries Hollywood was released to mixed reviews. Murphy served as co-creator, writer and director for the series. In June 2020, in honor of the 50th anniversary of the first LGBTQ Pride parade, Queerty named him among the fifty heroes "leading the nation toward equality, acceptance, and dignity for all people".

Murphy co-created, with Ian Brennan, Dahmer – Monster: The Jeffrey Dahmer Story, the ten-part miniseries that premiered on Netflix in September 2022. The series took the #1 spot on Netflix in the first week of its release.

In the media

In October 2015, Murphy received the Award of Inspiration from amfAR, The Foundation for AIDS Research for his contributions to TV and film as well as his work in the fight against AIDS.

In 2017, Murphy launched the Half Initiative, which aims to make Hollywood more inclusive by creating equal opportunities for women and minorities behind the camera. Less than one year after launching Half, Ryan Murphy Television's director slate hired 60% women directors and 90% met its women and minority requirement. In conjunction with the hiring goals, the Initiative launched the Half-Director Mentorship Program in which every director on every Ryan Murphy Television production mentors emerging women and minority directors through pre-production and post-production along with offering a significant stipend for their commitment. Filmmaker Kristin Fairweather, the first recipient of a HALF award, described her experience in an interview with Screen Comment's Rudy Cecera.

Unproduced projects
Murphy has also created and produced various unsuccessful television pilots. The WB sitcom pilot St. Sass, starring Delta Burke and Heather Matarazzo, was not picked up. In 2008, Murphy wrote and directed the FX pilot Pretty/Handsome, which also was not picked up. By April 2013, HBO had given a pilot order for Murphy's sexuality drama Open, which began filming in late 2013. By September 2014, HBO had opted not to proceed to series.

Murphy also had several films in development: Dirty Tricks, a political comedy, One Hit Wonders, a musical comedy, and a sequel to The Normal Heart. In 2014, Murphy was developing a feature film of the life of reclusive heiress Huguette Clark, based on the best-selling book Empty Mansions: The Mysterious Life of Huguette Clark and the Spending of a Great American Fortune. There has been no development on these films since their announcement.

Personal life
Ryan Murphy was born on November 9, 1965, Murphy was raised in an Irish Catholic family.

He attended Catholic school until eighth grade, and later graduated from Warren Central High School in Indianapolis. Murphy grew up in a Catholic household, but is “done with the Church", having left it; however he still occasionally goes to church. He serves on the National Advisory Board of Young Storytellers. He once owned a house designed by renowned mid-century modern architect Carl Maston.

In an interview about his show Pose, which is set in 1987, during the height of the initial AIDS crisis, Murphy described his concern about contracting HIV while at college, getting tested frequently even when celibate.

Murphy has been married to photographer David Miller since July 2012. They have three sons born via surrogacy.

Filmography

Film

Television 
Numbers in directing and writing credits refer to number of episodes.

Unsold TV pilots

Non-fiction TV series

Awards and nominations

Dorian Awards
The Dorian Awards are given by GALECA: The Society of LGBTQ Entertainment Critics and are named in homage to The Picture of Dorian Gray author Oscar Wilde. This truncated list only includes Murphy's individual Dorian nominations and wins. Several of his productions, such as  Glee and  The Normal Heart, have also been honored by the group.

Emmy Awards
Murphy has won 6 Primetime Emmy Awards out of 36 nominations as a producer, writer and director.

Golden Globe Awards
The Golden Globe Awards are awarded annually by the Hollywood Foreign Press Association recognizing excellence in film, both American and international, and American television. Murphy has won one award as a producer.

Grammy Awards
The Grammy Awards are awarded annually by the National Academy of Recording Arts and Sciences of the United States. Murphy has been nominated for two awards as a producer.

Tony Awards
Murphy has won one Tony Award out of two nominations as a producer.

Frequent collaborators
Throughout Murphy's various film and television projects, he had worked with various actors and actresses repeatedly. This includes, Jessica Lange, Sarah Paulson, Evan Peters, Kathy Bates, Angela Bassett, Billy Porter, Darren Criss, and Andrew Rannells among many others.

Footnotes for collaboration table

References

External links

 

1965 births
Living people
20th-century American writers
21st-century American writers
American people of Irish descent
American male screenwriters
American soap opera writers
American television directors
American television producers
Catholics from Indiana
American gay writers
Golden Globe Award-winning producers
Indiana University Bloomington alumni
LGBT Roman Catholics
LGBT television directors
LGBT producers
American LGBT screenwriters
Writers from Indianapolis
Roman Catholic writers
Showrunners
Primetime Emmy Award winners
LGBT people from Indiana
American film directors
American male television writers
20th-century American male writers
Screenwriters from Indiana
Tony Award winners
LGBT film directors